The Men's 30 kilometre skiathlon competition at the FIS Nordic World Ski Championships 2021 was held on 27 February 2021.

Results
The race was started at 13:30.

References

Men's 30 kilometre pursuit